Late for a Date (literally Girl in a hurry for a date) is a Soviet comedy film directed by Mikhail Verner. A new print was issued in 1987, completely redubbed.

Plot
Professor Leonid S. Fedorov and Nikolai Gurov, a cobbler at "Moskooppromsoyuza", both set off for the resort at Yessentuki. They have both left their passports at home and their wives both take them into the post-office to send them. The girl addressing the two envelopes is distracted by a phone conversation about a date and mistakenly sends the professor's passport to the cobbler and vice versa. After several comedic misunderstandings, the two men's wives arrive at the resort and clarify everything.

Cast
Boris Petker - Professor Fyodorov  
Mikhail Rostovtsev - Gurov  
Mariya Barabanova - mail delivery girl 
Vera Streshneva - Gurov's wife 
E. Pluta - Fyodorov's wife, Vera  
Alexander Beniaminov - telegraphist  
Andrei Kostrichkin  
Iona Bij-Brodsky - doctor
Mikhail Rozanov - bootblack  
Arnold Arnold - cameo 
Eugene Golynchik
Stepan Kayukov - Fyodorov's colleague
Irina Murzaeva - cameo
Georgy Georgiu
Erna Mashkevich - girl
Petr Hoffmann - cameo
Andrei Apsolon - cameo

Sources
Late for a Date on IMDB
http://tvkultura.ru/brand/show/brand_id/27110/

1936 comedy films
1936 films
Soviet comedy films
Films scored by Isaak Dunayevsky
Soviet-era Belarusian films
Belarusfilm films
Belarusian comedy films
Soviet black-and-white films